Nangibotide is an inhibitor of TREM-1, a receptor found on certain white blood cells. Activation of TREM-1 stimulates inflammation. Nangibotide is therefore being investigated as a treatment for the overwhelming inflammation typically seen in severe sepsis.

Chemistry 

Nangibotide is a 12-amino-acid polypeptide derived from TLT-1.

Mode of action 

TREM-1 is a receptor found on neutrophils, macrophages and monocytes, key elements of the immune system. Activation of TREM-1 results in expression of NF-κB, which promotes systemic inflammation. Nangibotide inhibits TREM-1, thereby preventing the inflammatory activation. Absence of TREM-1 results in vastly reduced inflammation without impairing the ability to fight infection.

Animal models 
LR17, a mouse equivalent of nangibotide, improves survival in mouse models of severe sepsis. In a pig model of sepsis, LR12 - another animal equivalent of nangibotide - resulted in significantly improved haemodynamics and less organ failure. In monkeys, LR12 also reduced the inflammatory and hypotensive effects of sepsis.

Human studies 
Nangibotide has demonstrated safety in Phase 1 (healthy volunteers) and Phase 2 (sick patients with septic shock) studies. The ASTONISH trial will examine clinical efficacy in 450 patients with septic shock.

References 

Anti-inflammatory agents
Peptides